Alberta Provincial Highway No. 563, commonly referred to as Highway 563, is a short highway in the province of Alberta, Canada.  It runs mostly west-east from Highway 1 exit 172 at Range Road 31 to Calgary city limits at Range Road 24 (101 Street SW). It is known as Old Banff Coach Road for its entire length, and unlike other provincial highways, has a speed limit of only  outside of Calgary.

Major intersections 
Starting from the west end of Old Banff Coach Road:

See also 

Transportation in Calgary

References 

Roads in Calgary
563